State Road 232 in the U.S. state of Indiana is a short route that connects at the west end with its parent, State Road 32, east of Anderson. It offers access to Mounds State Park.

Route description 
The western terminus of SR 232 is at an intersection of SR 32 and State Road 9 in Anderson.  SR 232 heads southeast from the intersection.  Near the intersection of Rangeline Road, SR 232 turns to the northeast.  At the intersection of Donnelly Road, SR 232 turns left heading to Mounds State Park.  SR 232 heads northeast until the entrance of Mounds State Park, the entrance is the eastern terminus of SR 232.

History 
It is a former routing of State Road 32, before it was routed northward on State Road 9 and then out to the east of the city.  SR 32 Continued past Mounds State Park moving south of the anderson Airport into Downtown Chesterfield.

Major intersections

References

External links

232
Transportation in Madison County, Indiana